John Alexander Stewart may refer to:

John Alexander Stewart (politician) (1867–1922), Canadian politician
John Alexander Stewart (scholar) (1882–1948), classical scholar, colonial public servant and professor of Burmese
John Alexander Stewart (philosopher) (1846–1933), Scottish writer, educator and philosopher

See also
John Stewart (disambiguation)